Pete McCormack (born January 27, 1965) is a Canadian author, filmmaker, screenwriter and musician. He is best known for directing the Academy Award short-listed documentary Facing Ali and the Leacock Award-nominated novel Understanding Ken. He is the creator of the HBO Canada documentary television  series Sports on Fire.

Film 
In 2003, McCormack directed and wrote his first feature film, the award-winning See Grace Fly, starring Paul McGillion and Gina Chiarelli. Chiarelli won multiple awards and was nominated for a Genie Award for her role as Grace McKinley, a woman suffering from schizophrenia.

In 2006, McCormack wrote and co-directed (with Jesse James Miller) the award-winning documentary Uganda Rising, about the plight of the people of Northern Uganda. The film was narrated by Academy Award-winner Kevin Spacey.
For UNICEF in 2007, McCormack wrote and co-directed (with Tim Hardy) the 25-minute Pierce Brosnan-narrated short film Hope in the Time of AIDS about the HIV and AIDS in sub-Saharan Africa, and the potential of antiretroviral drugs.

In 2009, McCormack directed the documentary Facing Ali. The film was short-listed in the 2010 Academy Awards’ category for best full-length documentary. In October 2009, the film won the Audience Choice award for Best Documentary at the Vancouver International Film Festival.

In 2011, McCormack directed I Am Bruce Lee, a biographical documentary of Bruce Lee. Its debut on Spike TV was the highest rated documentary in the station's history, reaching 1.4 million viewers. Spike's previous record-holder was McCormack's 2009 documentary, Facing Ali.

In 2015, McCormack created, directed and executive produced the HBO Canada documentary television series Sports On Fire. In 2016, his film Spirit Unforgettable, a profile of the rock band Spirit of the West on their final concert tour, premiered at the Hot Docs Canadian International Documentary Festival.

Screenplays:

 Whirlygirl, 2006, directed by Academy Award Winning producer Jim Wilson (Dances With Wolves)
 Plague City: SARS in Toronto (TV movie), 2005
 The Blue Butterfly, 2004, directed by Léa Pool and starring Academy Award winner William Hurt.

Novels 

McCormack's first novel, Shelby, about a university drop-out who falls for an exotic dancer near the end of her career, was published in 1994.

McCormack's second novel, Understanding Ken, was released in 1998. The novel focused on a young boy who creates a mythology around hockey, the Montreal Canadiens and Ken Dryden in order to deal with the trauma of his parents’ divorce.

In 1999 the novel was nominated for the Stephen Leacock Award for Canadian Humour, and named one of the 10 best books of the year by the Ottawa Citizen.

Music 
McCormack has released three independent CDs. His debut CD, Breathe, was released in 1995. Paul Hyde of Payola$ fame,  and members of Spirit of the West, Geoffrey Kelly, Hugh MacMillan and drummer and producer Vince Ditrich played on the CD. Renowned jazz musician and two-time Juno Award winner Brad Turner played the trumpet solo on the opening track “Stay With Me.”

McCormack released a second CD, Trust, in 1998. The track, Be Brave Tonight, was screen-tested in Los Angeles as the proposed song to close the Kevin Costner-film Message in a Bottle. The song was ultimately not chosen because the screen-test audience reportedly found the song combined with the film's ending “too depressing.”

McCormack recorded an unplugged third album, Wide Open, in 2008.

In 2009, he contributed the closing song to the Academy Award-shortlisted documentary, Facing Ali, which he also directed.

Personal life 
McCormack was born in Thetford, Norfolk, England. His father was a doctor. In 1966, his family emigrated to Canada where he grew up mostly in the West Kootenay area of British Columbia. His parents divorced when he was six.

McCormack attended Simon Fraser University and the University of British Columbia from 1984 to 1986. 
McCormack dropped out of university after three and a half years and started writing songs.

McCormack currently lives in Vancouver and is married to Samantha Reynolds, also a writer, and CEO of Echo Storytelling Agency, a custom media company.

References

External links 
 Pete McCormack

1965 births
Canadian male screenwriters
Film directors from Vancouver
Living people
Canadian humorists
People from Thetford
Canadian documentary film directors
Writers from Vancouver
British emigrants to Canada